The 1968 Northern Iowa Panthers football team represented the State College of Iowa—now known as University of Northern Iowa—as a member of the North Central Conference during the 1968 NCAA College Division football season. Led by ninth-year head coach Stan Sheriff, the Panthers compiled an overall record of 5–5 with a mark of 3–3 in conference play, tying for third place in the NCC. Northern Iowa played home games at O. R. Latham Stadium in Cedar Falls, Iowa.

Schedule

References

State College of Iowa
Northern Iowa Panthers football seasons
State College of Iowa Panthers football